Nag Hammadi Codex II (designated by siglum CG II) is a papyrus codex with a collection of early Christian Gnostic texts in Coptic (Sahidic dialect). The manuscript has survived in nearly perfect condition. The codex is dated to the 4th century. It is the only complete manuscript from antiquity with the text of the Gospel of Thomas.

Description 
The manuscript was written on papyrus in the form of a codex. The measurements of the leaves are 254 mm by 158 mm. Originally the codex contained 76 unnumbered leaves, now 74 leaves. It is written in Sahidic dialect. Pages A–B are blank. The codex contains:

 The Apocryphon of John
 The Gospel of Thomas, a sayings gospel, pages C–D blank
 The Gospel of Philip
 The Hypostasis of the Archons
 On the Origin of the World
 The Exegesis on the Soul
 The Book of Thomas the Contender.

The text is written in uncial letters. It is well written in an informal book hand. There is no punctuation, no division between sayings. The nomina sacra are contracted in a usual way, the words at the end of each line are abbreviated and it uses ligatures, including staurograms.

The manuscript was written by two scribes (A and B). Scribe B copied only the first 8 lines of page 47 and is not otherwise represented in the Nag Hammadi collection. Scribe A copied all leaves except the 8 lines on page 47, employed several styles, and left some blank pages because the text from which he copied was imperfect or illegible (probably). Scribe A is identical with the scribe of Codex XIII.

It was discovered in 1945 at Nag Hammadi. It was first published in a photographic edition in 1956. The leaves of the codex were separated in 1957 and rejoined in 1974–1975.

On June 8, 1952 the Coptic Museum received the codex. Currently the manuscript is housed at the Department of manuscripts of the Coptic Museum (Inv. 10544) in Cairo.

See also 
 Coptic manuscripts
 British Library Or 4926
 Nag Hammadi Codex XIII
 Nag Hammadi Library

 Greek manuscripts
 Papyrus Oxyrhynchus 1
 Papyrus Oxyrhynchus 654
 Papyrus Oxyrhynchus 655

References

Further reading 
 Nicholas Perrin, HC II,2 and the Oxyrhynchus Fragments (P. Oxy 1, 654, 655): Overlooked Evidence for a Syriac "Gospel of Thomas", Vigiliae Christianae, Vol. 58, No. 2 (May, 2004), pp. 138–151
 Bentley Layton, Nag Hammadi codex II, 2–7: together with XIII, 2*, Brit. Lib. Or.4926(1), and P.OXY. 1, 654, 655 : with contributions by many scholars, BRILL, 1989.

External links 
 Nag Hammadi Archive in the Claremont Colleges Library
 Antiquities of the Institute for Antiquity and Christianity in the Claremont Colleges Digital Library
 Facsimile of the papyrus MS of the Gospel of Thomas
 Gospel of Thomas Bibliography, Coptic & Greek Texts

Gnostic Gospels
4th-century manuscripts
Nag Hammadi library